The Moonshiner is a 1904 American short silent action film produced by the American Mutoscope & Biograph Company and directed by Wallace McCutcheon, Sr.

Plot
A family of moonshiners loads several jugs of illicit whiskey onto a horse-drawn wagon.  They leave to make a transaction.  A government agent ("The Revenue Spy") observes their departure and heads after them on horseback.  The agent observes the family trading the moonshine for corn, thus securing the evidence.  The agent heads back to notify his colleagues, and they all leave to make the arrest.  Meanwhile, the moonshiners go to work on their still.  Significant footage is devoted to showing the methods and procedures of operating the still, which adds a documentary dimension to the film.  The lookout is ambushed and apprehended by the government agents, who proceed to have a gunfight with the two outlaws operating the still.  One of the outlaws is killed and the other flees, only to be shot by another agent.  In retribution, the outlaw's wife kills the agent.  The final scene shows the outlaw dying in his wife's arms.  The final intertitle reads "The Law Vindicated" but the film appears to portray the outlaws in a sympathetic light, undermining the moral message.

Production and distribution
The film was filmed on location in Scarsdale, New York in June and July 1904. It was produced and distributed by the American Mutoscope & Biograph Company.  The film was produced with intertitles, which became standard on subsequent Biograph films.

Analysis

The film has been mentioned as an example of the "story films" produced by Biograph in the early 1900s, which allowed this company to overtake the Edison Company as "America's foremost motion picture producer".  These types of films helped usher in the "Nickelodeon Era" (c. 1905-1915), a period of rapid expansion of small storefront movie theaters.

References

External links
https://www.youtube.com/watch?v=bZyttk48N2I   
https://www.imdb.com/title/tt0283495/

1904 films
American silent short films
American black-and-white films
1900s crime films
1900s action films
Films directed by Wallace McCutcheon Sr.
American crime action films
Films about alcoholic drinks
1900s American films
1900s English-language films